Eilema aurantiotestacea is a moth of the  subfamily Arctiinae. It is found on Ambon Island.

References

aurantiotestacea